Progress M-4 was a Soviet uncrewed cargo spacecraft which was launched in 1990 to resupply the Mir space station. The twenty-second of sixty four Progress spacecraft to visit Mir, it used the Progress-M 11F615A55 configuration, and had the serial number 204. It carried supplies including food, water and oxygen for the EO-7 crew aboard Mir, as well as equipment for conducting scientific research, and fuel for adjusting the station's orbit and performing manoeuvres.

Progress M-4 was launched at 04:00:41 GMT on 15 August 1990, atop a Soyuz-U2 carrier rocket flying from Site 1/5 at the Baikonur Cosmodrome. It docked with the forward port of Mir's Core module at 05:26:13 GMT on 17 August.

Progress M-4 undocked from Mir at 12:42:43 GMT on 17 September, and was deorbited three days later on 20 September, with the deorbit burn starting at 11:04:27. It burned up in the atmosphere over the Pacific Ocean, with remaining debris landing in the ocean at around 11:42:49.

See also

1990 in spaceflight
List of Progress flights
List of uncrewed spaceflights to Mir

References

1990 in the Soviet Union
Progress (spacecraft) missions
Spacecraft launched in 1990